Ena ("One") is the eighth studio album by the popular Greek artist Peggy Zina, recorded at Diogenes Studio and released on 8 November 2006, by Minos EMI. In August 2007, it was repackaged with Zina's single "Mystiko" and named Ena New Edition.

The song "Mystiko" was written for her wedding, where she sang the song to her husband at the reception.

Track listing

Singles
The following songs from the album were released as radio singles and each featured a music video:

"Ena"
"Ena" was the first single released from the album. A music video for the song was made, directed by Konstantinos Rigos.

"Ego Ta Spao"
"Ego Ta Spao" was the second single released from the album and also has a music video directed by Rigos. The video was first shown on MAD TV on 31 January 2007.

"Eimai Edo"
"Eimai Edo" was the third and final single from the album and also has a music video directed by Rigos.

Chart performance
The Special Edition of the album remained on the Cypriot Album Chart for more than 52 weeks

References

2006 albums
Greek-language albums
Peggy Zina albums
Minos EMI albums